Omega-3 fatty acids, also called ω−3 fatty acids or n−3 fatty acids, are polyunsaturated fatty acids (PUFAs). Omega−3 fatty acids are important for normal metabolism.

Mammals are unable to synthesize omega−3 fatty acids, but can obtain the shorter-chain omega−3 fatty acid ALA (18 carbons and 3 double bonds) through diet and use it to form the more important long-chain omega−3 fatty acids, EPA (20 carbons and 5 double bonds) and then from EPA, the most crucial, DHA (22 carbons and 6 double bonds).

List of omega-3 fatty acids

List of foods with omega-3 fatty acids

List of omega-3 oils

See also
Fatty acid
Essential fatty acid
Essential nutrient

References 

Fatty acids